Thomas McMillan Campbell (born 20 February 1935 in Glasgow; died 2018) was a Scottish footballer, who played as striker for Kilmarnock, Albion Rovers (two spells), Dundee United, Tranmere Rovers, Dumbarton and Stenhousemuir.

Career
Beginning his career with Kilmarnock, Campbell moved to Albion Rovers where scored over thirty league goals in less than sixty league matches. His goalscoring form won him a move to Dundee United where he kept up his prolific record, netting fourteen goals in just nineteen league games. This included scoring a hat-trick against Hamilton Academical in his first match for club. Crucially he also was the scorer of the only goal in a 1–0 win over Berwick Rangers on 30 April which ensured Dundee United were promoted to Division One. However, by November 1960 he had dropped out of the first team line-up. In turn, he moved to English side Tranmere Rovers but was back in Scotland within the year, having failed to score in four matches. An even shorter spell at Dumbarton followed before a further short time at Stenhousemuir preceded a final playing period Albion Rovers. Upon retiring in 1964, Campbell managed more than a goal in every two league matches over his short career.

References

External links

1935 births
2018 deaths
Albion Rovers F.C. players
Dumbarton F.C. players
Dundee United F.C. players
Kilmarnock F.C. players
Footballers from Glasgow
Scottish Football League players
Scottish footballers
Stenhousemuir F.C. players
English Football League players
Tranmere Rovers F.C. players
Association football forwards